Hamidiyeh (also Romanized as Ḩamīdīyeh) is a village in Karkas Rural District, in the Central District of Natanz County, Isfahan Province, Iran. At the 2006 census, its population was 31, in 7 families.

References 

Populated places in Natanz County